Scopula segregata is a moth of the  family Geometridae. It is found in Burma.

References

Moths described in 1919
segregata
Moths of Asia